A stave church (Norwegian: stavkirke) is a church built of timbers with a supporting structure of posts (pillars) standing on reclining sleepers or timbers and carrying poles. The structural joints in the wall form frames that are filled with standing planks or tiles. The poles (stavene) have given name to this church type. Stave churches are now considered to be among the most important representatives of European medieval architecture in wood and are represented by the Urnes Stave Church on the UNESCO World Heritage List.

This list contains 28 preserved stave churches.  Reference is also made to the Fantoft Stave Church, which is a reconstruction of the church destroyed by arson; Vang Church which is today in Poland; and two of the churches that were built in the 1600s with inspiration from the stave churches Fåvang Stave Church and Vågå Church. Uvdal church from 1893 is built with a dragon style and other style elements, but is not included in this list.

Lost Stave Churches

In the Middle Ages there were probably over 1000 stave churches in Norway, but most disappeared in the period 1350–1650, probably as a result of changing needs after the Black Death and the Reformation.  In 1650, there were about 270 stave churches left in Norway, and in the next hundred years 136 of them disappeared. Around 1800 there were still 95 stave churches, while over 200 former stave churches were still known by name or written sources (according to Lorentz Dietrichson). From 1850 to 1885 32 stave churches were lost, but only Fantoft Stave Church has been lost since then.

After the Reformation, some stave churches were enlarged or rebuilt with log construction. For example, Flesberg Stave Church was expanded to a cross church with the cross arms in timber logs, while the Rømskog Church that was built with stave construction was replaced by a church in timber logs. Also Hol old church was originally a stave church, but was rebuilt or expanded until there was little trace of the demolished building. Vågå Church is sometimes referred to as a stave church, but is the result of extensive reconstruction with reuse of materials from the demolished stave church.

The existing stave churches are concentrated on the upper valley regions of eastern Norway (Østlandet) (Gudbrandsdalen, Numedal, Hallingdal, Valdres and Telemark) and the inner fjord regions of western Norway.  Exceptions are in particular the two stave churches that have been moved to Bergen and Oslo, and Grip Stave Church which is located on a vacated island in the sea. A map of the 322 stave churches known in 1800 shows that there were the most stave churches in the least populated areas, while there are most stone churches in the cities, in the flat settlements (Østlandet and Trøndelag), along the coast and in the largest church parish in the fjords in Vestlandet. There were mostly stave churches in the mountain valleys and forest villages, and in fishing villages on the islands and smaller fjord arms. Where the parish churches were in stone, the annex could be a stave church. For example, the main church in Aurland (Vangen church) is in stone, while there is a stave church in Undredal and there was probably a stave church in Flåm.

Preserved Stave Churches

Innlandet

In addition:
 Fåvang – Extensive reconstruction, reclassified
 Vang – moved to Riesengebirge, Poland in the 1800s
 Vågå – Extensive reconstruction, reclassified

Møre og Romsdal

Trøndelag

Vestfold og Telemark

Vestland

 Also Fantoft Stave Church at Fantoft near Bergen; burned down and was rebuilt as a copy, not on the official list.

Viken

See also
 List of archaeological sites and dismantled stave churches
 Stave church
 Medieval Scandinavian architecture
 Post church
 Palisade church

References

Types of church buildings
 
Stave churches in Norway
Scandinavian architecture
Medieval architecture